Saul Polo is a Canadian politician in Quebec, who was elected to the National Assembly of Quebec in the 2014 election. He represented the electoral district of Laval-des-Rapides as a member of the Quebec Liberal Party until his defeat in the 2022 Quebec general election.

He has also served as president of the party from 2012 to 2014.

References

External links
Saul Polo

Canadian political party presidents
Quebec Liberal Party MNAs
Living people
Colombian emigrants to Canada
Politicians from Laval, Quebec
21st-century Canadian politicians
Year of birth missing (living people)